The 2016 Ukrainian Football Amateur League season is the 20th since it replaced the competition of physical culture clubs. It started on April 16, 2016.

There are 24 teams competing during the season which will consist of two phases, the first phase will be a group stage with six groups of four teams and the second phase will be a final playoff stage. All group winners and two best second placed teams will advance to playoffs which will start from quarterfinals.

The last season winner Balkany Zorya will be the defending champions.

Teams
 Debut: FC Lutsk, FC Malynsk, FC Hirnyk Sosnivka, FC Voloka, MFC Zhytomyr, SC Chaika Petropavlivska-Borshchahivka, FC Vradiyivka, FC Sudnobudivnyk Mykolaiv, FC Inhulets-2 Petrove
 Newly admitted former professional clubs: FC Nyva Ternopil, FC Podillya Khmelnytskyi, FC Nyva-V Vinnytsia, FC Kryvbas Kryvyi Rih, FC Metalurh Zaporizhia
 Returning clubs: FC Teplovyk Ivano-Frankivsk, FC Ahrobiznes Volochysk, FC Kolos Khlibodarivka

Withdrawn
List of clubs that took part in last year competition, but chose not to participate in 2016 season.
 FC Rukh Vynnyky
 FC Opir Lviv
 FC Mal Korosten
 FC Kolos Zachepylivka
 FC VPK-Ahro Shevchenkivka

Locations

First stage

Group 1

Top goalscorers

Group 2

Notes:
 Game ODEK-Voloka failed to take place, ODEK was awarded technical victory (3:0).

Top goalscorers

Group 3

Top goalscorers

Group 4

Top goalscorers

Group 5

Notes:
 Game Avanhard-Inhulets-2 failed to take place, Avanhard was awarded technical victory (3:0).

Top goalscorers

Group 6

Top goalscorers

Playoffs
Advanced teams: Balkany Zorya (21 May), Yednist Plysky (28 May), Tavria-Skif Rozdol (28 May), FC Malynsk (29 May), ODEK Orzhiv (29 May), Ahrobiznes Volochysk (29 May), Zhemchuzhyna Odessa (29 May), FC Vradiyivka (29 May)

Quarterfinals
The stage draw took place on 6 June 2016 in the FFU House of Football. Games were played on 11/12 and 15/18 June 2016.

Notes

Semifinals
Games were played on 25/26 June and 2/3 July 2016. The draw took place on 20 June 2016 in the House of Football.

Championship final

Top goalscorers

Promotion
On 2 June 2016, FFU issued professional licenses to most of clubs of the Professional Football League of Ukraine, while some clubs were given additional time to apply. Among the clubs that received licenses were five former amateur clubs. Following amateur teams were awarded professional licenses for the 2016–17 Ukrainian Second League: FC Balkany Zorya, FC Nyva-V Vinnytsia, FC Podillya Khmelnytskyi, FC Rukh Vynnyky, and FC Zhemchuzhyna Odesa. On 17 June 2016, the Professional Football League of Ukraine (PFL) announced that FC Metalurh Zaporizhia also was allowed to compete at the Second League. After the PFL Conference on 24 June 2016, the Second League might be also able to accept FC Illichivets-2 Mariupol and FC Inhulets-2 Petrove. On 15 June 2016, three more clubs were given extension by the FFU Executive Committee to apply for professional licenses, among which are FC Sudnobudivnyk Mykolaiv, FC Teplovyk Ivano-Frankivsk, and FC Lutsk.

References

External links
AAFU
 Calendar of competitions. AAFU website. 17 April 2016
 2016 season regulations. AAFU website. 17 April 2016
AAFU discussed possibility of transitioning to a new format. Football Federation of Ukraine. 25 February 2016.
Order of conducting the All-Ukrainian competitions among amateur teams soon might change. AAFU website. 24 February 2016

Ukrainian Football Amateur League seasons
4
Uk